The Baglioni Madonna or Madonna and Child with Saint Jerome and Saint Anne is an oil on panel painting by Andrea Previtali, executed c. 1512–1513, now in the art gallery of the Accademia Carrara in Bergamo. His earliest surviving work, it is signed ANDREAS.BER.PIN. Since 1900 it has been named after its last private owner Francesco Baglioni, who gave it to its present home. It belongs to the sacra conversazione genre. It was restored in 2011 by Amalia Pacia of the Sovraintendenza per i Beni Storici Artistici ed Etnoatropologici di Mialno and Maria Cristina Rodeschini from the Accademia Carrara

Additional images

References

Bibliography
 
 

Paintings by Andrea Previtali
Paintings of the Madonna and Child
Paintings of Jerome
Paintings of Saint Anne
Collections of the Accademia Carrara